Aramis Naglić (born 28 August 1965) is a Croatian professional basketball coach and former player who is the head coach for Vienna of the Austrian League.

His most important trophies as a player including the silver medal with the Croatia national team at the 1992 Summer Olympics, and two European Cup titles with Jugoplastika Split.

Coaching career 
After a 22-year-long playing career, Naglić started his coaching career. He coached Goranin, Crikvenica and Kvarner 2010 before taking over Inter Bratislava which he led to the 2013 Slovak League title.

In 2015, following the appointment of Velimir Perasović as the head coach of the Croatian national team, Naglić joined his staff as an assistant coach. As Croatia was eliminated in round 16 game of the 2015 EuroBasket, Perasović with his staff being fired. He also worked as the head coach of Škrljevo in the Croatian League for the one season. In 2017, Croatian club Zadar appointed Naglić as their new head coach. He left Zadar in June 2018.

In February 2019, Naglić was named the head coach of Inter Bratislava for the second time in his coaching career. In June 2020, he left the club.

In January, 2021, Naglić signed with Vienna of the Austrian League.

References

External links
 Aramis Naglić at FIBA Europe

1965 births
Living people
Basketball players at the 1992 Summer Olympics
Croatian basketball coaches
Croatian men's basketball players
KK Cibona players
KK Split players
KK Zadar players
Olympic basketball players of Croatia
Olympic medalists in basketball
Olympic silver medalists for Croatia
Reyer Venezia players
Basketball players from Rijeka
Medalists at the 1992 Summer Olympics
KK Zadar coaches
Power forwards (basketball)
Traiskirchen Lions players

Bosniaks of Croatia
BC Vienna coaches
KK Kvarner players